Lou Sheppard or Loulia Sheppard is an English Special effects make-up artist. Known for her work on films Fantastic Beasts and Where to Find Them, Now You See Me 2, Florence Foster Jenkins, Avengers: Age of Ultron, Guardians of the Galaxy, Anna Karenina, The King's Speech, and Victoria & Abdul, for which she was nominated with Daniel Phillips for Academy Award for Best Makeup and Hairstyling nomination at 90th Academy Awards.

References

External links
 

Living people
Special effects people
English film people
Year of birth missing (living people)
Place of birth missing (living people)